Hyperoside is a chemical compound. It is the 3-O-galactoside of quercetin.

Natural occurrences 
Hyperoside has been isolated from Drosera rotundifolia, from the Lamiaceae Stachys sp. and Prunella vulgaris, from Rumex acetosella, Cuscuta chinensis seeds, from St John's wort and from Camptotheca acuminata. It is one of the phenolic compounds in the invasive plant Carpobrotus edulis and contributes to the antibacterial properties of the plant.

In Rheum nobile and R. rhaponticum, it serves as a UV blocker found in the bracts.

It is also found in Geranium niveum and Taxillus kaempferi.

References

Quercetin glycosides
Flavonoid galactosides
Kappa-opioid receptor antagonists
Mu-opioid receptor antagonists